Marthanda may refer to one of the following persons.
Marthanda Varma
Marthanda Bhairava Thondaiman, a ruler of an Indian state, see Pudukkottai District
Marthanda Perumal Pararajasekaran III (Marthanda Perumal), a ruler of Sri Lanka (see also "Jaffna Kingdom"